The Malaysian Solidarity Party or in  (MSP) was a political party based in Malaysia formed in 1986. It became defunct after the Malaysian general election, 1990 and the resignation of its Chairman, Yeoh Poh San and other Central Committee members. MSC was one of the seven coalition members of Gagasan Rakyat (GR).

Party logo

See also
Politics of Malaysia
List of political parties in Malaysia

References

Political parties established in 1986
1986 establishments in Malaysia